The Tsaigumi UAV is an unmanned aerial vehicle designed and used by the Nigerian Air Force. It is one of the first UAVs indigenously developed in Nigeria.

This is in furtherance of the ongoing drive to produce and incorporate made-in-Nigeria military weapons.

History
Former President Goodluck Jonathan claimed that the Tsaigumi is actually the same as the GULMA drone developed by Nigeria in 2013, and hence not the first domestic Nigerian UAV. Air Vice Marshall Olatokunbo Adesanya disputed this, claiming that the GULMA drone "was not operational", and that the Tsaigumi was thus the first completed Nigerian UAV.

Operations
Air Vice Marshal Olatokunbo Adesanya stated that the Tsaigumi would be used for operations including disaster monitor, law enforcement, weather forecasting, protecting wildlife, and monitoring Nigeria's exclusive economic zone.

Design
The Tsaigumi UAV's airframe was built by the 431 Engineering Group of the Nigerian Air Force, with the avionics and telemetry equipment were developed by UAVision of Portugal. The designer was reported to be Nkemdilim Anulika Ofodile, an aerospace engineer in the Nigerian Air Force.

Tsaigumi means 'surveillance' in the local Hausa language. It is a twin-boom UAV spotting a pusher propeller configuration. It is fitted with an Electro-Optical Forward Looking Infra-red System (EO FLIR).

For take-off and landing, the Tsaigumi UAV is fitted with a tri-cycle landing gears which has two main wheels and a steerable front wheel attached to the nose of the vehicle.

Its maximum take-off weight is 95 kg.

General characteristics 
Crew: 3 Operator (Mission Commander, Pilot, Navigator)

Length: 

Wingspan: 

Max takeoff weight: 95 kg

Powerplant:

Performance 
Maximum speed: 

Mission radius: 

Range: 

Endurance: 10 hours

Service ceiling: 

Operational altitude:

Armament 
None

Avionics
 Day/Night EO FLIR
 GPS
 INS

Service history
The Tsaigumi was formally inducted into service on February 15, 2018.

References

Nigerian Air Force
Unmanned aerial vehicles of Nigeria
Military equipment of Nigeria